Ceccardo Egidio Fucigna (1834 - 1884) was an Italian sculptor who established a long partnership with the architect William Burges.

Fucigna worked as an assistant to John Birnie Philip until the latter's death in 1875, and then oversaw the completion of some of Philip's works, including the monument to Edward Akroyd, MP, at Halifax.

He later worked with William Burges at Cardiff Castle, where he sculpted the Virgin and Child in the Roof Garden, at Castell Coch, where he was responsible for the Madonna over the drawbridge gate, and also undertook work at Royal Holloway College and at the Albert Memorial.

Notes

1834 births
1884 deaths
People from Carrara
Italian expatriates in the United Kingdom
19th-century Italian sculptors
Italian male sculptors
19th-century Italian male artists